Martina Navratilova and Helena Suková were the defending champions but did not compete together. Suková partnered with Andrea Temesvári but they were eliminated in the round robin.

Navratilova and Jana Novotná defeated Tracy Austin and Kathy Rinaldi-Stunkel in the final, 7–5, 6–0 to win the ladies' invitation doubles tennis title at the 2010 Wimbledon Championships.

Draw

Final

Group A
Standings are determined by: 1. number of wins; 2. number of matches; 3. in two-players-ties, head-to-head records; 4. in three-players-ties, percentage of sets won, or of games won; 5. steering-committee decision.

Group B
Standings are determined by: 1. number of wins; 2. number of matches; 3. in two-players-ties, head-to-head records; 4. in three-players-ties, percentage of sets won, or of games won; 5. steering-committee decision.

External links
 Draw

Women's Invitation Doubles